Duanzhou or Duan Prefecture was a zhou (prefecture) in imperial China in modern Guangdong, China, centering on modern Zhaoqing. Duan Prefecture was a major production center of inkstones.

The modern Duanzhou District in Zhaoqing is named after the prefecture.

Counties
Duan Prefecture administered the following counties through history (Sui dynasty, Tang dynasty, Southern Han and Song dynasty):
Gaoyao, roughly modern Zhaoqing city proper (probably around Gaoyao District).
Pingxing, roughly modern Gaoming District, Foshan. Pingxing was abolished by the Song dynasty in 972.
Sihui, roughly modern Sihui. Sihui was only under the administration of Duan Prefecture in the Song dynasty.

References

 
 
 

589 establishments
6th-century establishments in China
1118 disestablishments in Asia
12th-century disestablishments in China
Prefectures of the Sui dynasty
Prefectures of the Tang dynasty
Guangnan East Circuit
Prefectures of Southern Han
Zhaoqing
Former prefectures in Guangdong